The 2008 NCAA Division I Men's Basketball Championship Game was the finals of the 2008 NCAA Division I men's basketball tournament and it determined the national champion for the 2007-08 NCAA Division I men's basketball season. The 2008 national title game was played on April 7, 2008 at the Alamodome in San Antonio, Texas. The 2008 national title game was played between the 2008 South Regional Champions, #1-seeded Memphis, and the 2008 Midwest Regional Champions, #1-seeded Kansas.

All four #1 seeds were in the Final Four for the first time (and only) in NCAA Tournament history and, for the second consecutive year, the national title game was played between two #1 seeds.

Participants

Kansas

Kansas entered the 2008 NCAA tournament as the #1 seed in the Midwest Regional. In the 1st round of the 2008 NCAA Tournament, Kansas dominated Portland State with an 85-61 victory. In the 2nd round of the 2008 NCAA Tournament, Kansas beat UNLV 75-56 to advance to the Sweet 16. In the Sweet 16 of the 2008 NCAA Tournament, Kansas beat Villanova 72-57 to advance to the Elite Eight. In the Elite Eight of the 2008 NCAA Tournament, Kansas was able to overcome Stephen Curry's 25 points to beat Davidson 59-57 and advance to the 2008 Final Four. In the 2008 Final Four, Brandon Rush scored 25 points to beat North Carolina 84-66 to advance to the 2008 national title game. North Carolina was coached by former Kansas head coach Roy Williams, it was the first time Williams had coached against Kansas since leaving after the 2002-03 season.

Memphis

Memphis entered the 2008 NCAA tournament as the #1 seed in the South Regional. In the 1st round of the 2008 NCAA Tournament, Memphis had a 15-2 run that eventually led to an 87-63 victory over Texas-Arlington. In the 2nd round of the 2008 NCAA Tournament, Joey Dorsey had a double-double with 13 points and 12 rebounds to lead Memphis to a 77-74 victory over Mississippi State to advance to the Sweet 16 for the 3rd consecutive year. In the Sweet 16 of the 2008 NCAA Tournament, Memphis finally proved that they were the top seed in their region by routing Michigan State with a 92-74 victory. Memphis' 85-67 victory over Texas advanced the Tigers to the 2008 Final Four, sending coach John Calipari to the Final Four for the first time since 1996 with UMass. In the 2008 Final Four, Derrick Rose scored 25 points to beat UCLA 78-63 and advance to the 2008 National Title Game.

Memphis was the first team in NCAA history to have 38 wins in a season, though those wins were later vacated.

Starting lineups

Game summary

1st Half
Darrell Arthur's 8 points and Mario Chalmers's five points in the 1st 11-and-a-half minutes gave Kansas a 22-15 lead with 8:30 remaining in the 1st half. Then, Chris Douglas-Roberts scored 7 points in 4 minutes to tie the game at 28-28. A Brandon Rush 3-point play and a Darrell Arthur 2-point jumper gave Kansas a 33-28 lead at halftime.

2nd half
Antonio Anderson got off to a hot start in the 2nd half to give Memphis a 36-35 lead. Then, with 13:35 remaining, Darnell Jackson scored 4 points in the next 30 seconds to give Kansas a 43-40 lead. Then, Derrick Rose would score 4 points in the next 2 minutes to cut the Kansas lead to 45-44. With 8:30 remaining with a 47-46 deficit, Derrick Rose got the show going with 10 points in the next 4 minutes to take a 56-49 lead. After Robert Dozier made a pair of free throws to give Memphis a 60-51 lead with 2 minutes remaining, Kansas began a furious comeback. It started with Darrell Arthur making a 2-point jumper and Sherron Collins making a 3-pointer to cut the Memphis lead to 60-56. A pair of Mario Chalmers free throws and a Darrell Arthur basket cut the Memphis lead to 62-60. With 10 seconds left, Derrick Rose missed the first of his two free throws and made the second to give Memphis a 63-60 lead. With 2.1 seconds left, Mario Chalmers made a 3-pointer to tie the game at 63.  Robert Dozier had a chance to win it, but his desperation halfcourt heave bounced off the backboard, and the game went to overtime for the seventh time in the national title game's history, and the first time since the 1997 National Title Game, when Arizona beat Kentucky 84-79 in overtime.

Overtime
In the first 2-and-a-half minutes of overtime, Brandon Rush, Darrell Arthur, and Darnell Jackson each made a basket to give Kansas a 69-63 lead.  In the next 1-and-a-half minutes of overtime, Chris Douglas-Roberts scored 5 points to cut the Kansas lead to 71-68 with 1 minute remaining. Mario Chalmers and Sherron Collins each made a pair of free throws to give Kansas a 75-68 overtime victory over Memphis and Kansas' first national championship since 1988.

Aftermath
Memphis would have its entire season vacated due to problems with Derrick Rose's SATs. On March 30, 2009, John Calipari became the head coach at Kentucky. 
Kansas would wait another 14 years when they won it in 2022.

References

NCAA Division I Men's Basketball Championship Game
NCAA Division I Men's Basketball Championship Games
Kansas Jayhawks men's basketball
Memphis Tigers men's basketball
College basketball tournaments in Texas
Basketball competitions in San Antonio
NCAA Division I Men's Basketball Championship Game
21st century in San Antonio